Sanmin railway station is a railway station located in Yuli Township, Hualien County, Taiwan. It is located on the Taitung line and is operated by Taiwan Railways.

References

1917 establishments in Taiwan
Railway stations opened in 1917
Railway stations in Hualien County
Railway stations served by Taiwan Railways Administration